Spence may refer to:

Places
 Spence, Australian Capital Territory, a suburb of Canberra, Australia
 Division of Spence,  a federal electoral division in Australia
 Spence, South Australia, a locality
 Spence, Ontario, Canada, a ghost town

People
 Spence (surname), a list of people with the surname Spence
 Spence (given name), a list of people with the given name or nickname

Maritime vessels
 , two ships of the Royal Navy
 , a World War II destroyer
 Spence (tugboat), a tugboat that sank in 2015

Other uses
 Spence Diamonds, a Canadian jewelry retailer
 Spence School, a day school for girls in New York City
 Spence Air Base, Georgia, United States, a United States Air Force base from 1941 to 1961, reopened as:
 Spence Airport, Georgia, United States, a public-use airport
 Spence Kovak, a fictional character played by Jeremy Piven

See also
 Spence Shale, the middle member of the Langston Formation in southeastern Idaho and northeastern Utah, United States
 Spence Harbor, a bay of Coronation Island in the South Orkney Islands
 Spences Reefs, Tasmania, Australia
 Spence's Hotel, Kolkata, India, a former hotel established in 1830
 Spence's function, a mathematical function
 Spencer (disambiguation)
 Spens (disambiguation)